Stuart Russell (16 July 1906 – 16 July 1978) was an Australian rules footballer who played with Essendon and Hawthorn in the Victorian Football League (VFL).

Russell was initially recruited from the Cobram Football Club in the Goulburn Valley Football Association in 1926.

Russell returned to Essendon in 1931 via the Barooga Football Club from the Murray Football League for three senior appearances before playing with the Hawthorn Football Club in 1932.

Notes

External links 

1906 births
1978 deaths
Australian rules footballers from New South Wales
Essendon Football Club players
Hawthorn Football Club players